Middlemarch, A Study of Provincial Life is a novel by the English author Mary Anne Evans, who wrote as George Eliot. It first appeared in eight installments (volumes) in 1871 and 1872. Set in Middlemarch, a fictional English Midland town, in 1829 to 1832, it follows distinct, intersecting stories with many characters. Issues include the status of women, the nature of marriage, idealism, self-interest, religion, hypocrisy, political reform, and education. Despite comic elements, Middlemarch uses realism to encompass historical events: the 1832 Reform Act, early railways, and the accession of King William IV. It looks at medicine of the time and reactionary views in a settled community facing unwelcome change. Eliot began writing the two pieces that formed the novel in 1869–1870 and completed it in 1871. Initial reviews were mixed, but it is now seen widely as her best work and one of the great English novels.

Background

Middlemarch originates in two unfinished pieces that Eliot worked on during 1869 and 1870: the novel "Middlemarch (which focused on the character of Lydgate) and the long story "Miss Brooke" (which focused on the character of Dorothea). The former piece is first mentioned in her journal on 1 January 1869 as one of the tasks for the coming year. In August she began writing, but progress ceased in the following month amidst a lack of confidence in it and distraction from the illness of George Henry Lewes's son Thornie, who was dying of tuberculosis. (Eliot had been living with Lewes since 1854.) After Thornie's death on 19 October 1869, all work on the novel stopped; it is uncertain whether or not Eliot intended at the time to revive it at a later date.

In December she wrote of having begun another story, on a subject that she had considered "ever since I began to write fiction". By the end of the month she had written a hundred pages of this story and entitled it "Miss Brooke". Although a precise date is unknown, the process of incorporating material from "Middlemarch into the story she had been working on was ongoing by March 1871. While composing, Eliot compiled a notebook of hundreds of literary quotations, from poets, historians, playwrights, philosophers, and critics in eight different languages.

By May 1871, the growing length of the novel had become a concern to Eliot, as it threatened to exceed the three-volume format that was the norm in publishing. The issue was compounded because Eliot's most recent novel, Felix Holt, the Radical (1866) – also set in the same pre-Reform Bill England – had not sold well. The publisher John Blackwood, who had made a loss on acquiring the English rights to that novel, was approached by Lewes in his role as Eliot's literary agent. He suggested that the novel be brought out in eight two-monthly parts, borrowing the method used for Victor Hugo's novel Les Misérables. This was an alternative to the monthly issues that had been used for such longer works as Charles Dickens's David Copperfield and William Makepeace Thackeray's Vanity Fair, and avoided Eliot's objections to the slicing of her novel into small parts. Blackwood agreed, although he feared there would be "complaints of a want of the continuous interest in the story" due to the independence of each volume. The eight books duly appeared during 1872, the last three instalments being issued monthly.

With the deaths of Thackeray and Dickens in 1863 and 1870, respectively, Eliot became "recognised as the greatest living English novelist" at the time of the novel's final publication.

Plot

Middlemarch centres on the lives of residents of Middlemarch, a fictitious Midlands town, from 1829 onwards – the years up to the 1832 Reform Act. The narrative may be considered to consist of four plots with unequal emphasis: the life of Dorothea Brooke, the career of Tertius Lydgate, the courtship of Mary Garth by Fred Vincy, and the disgrace of Nicholas Bulstrode. The two main plots are those of Dorothea and Lydgate. Each plot occurs concurrently, although Bulstrode's is centred on the later chapters.

 
Dorothea Brooke is a 19-year-old orphan, living with her younger sister, Celia, as a ward of her uncle, Mr Brooke. Dorothea is an especially pious young woman whose hobby involves the renovation of buildings belonging to the tenant farmers, although her uncle discourages her. Dorothea is courted by Sir James Chettam, a man close to her own age, but she is oblivious to him. She is attracted instead to the Rev. Edward Casaubon, a 45-year-old scholar. Dorothea accepts Casaubon's offer of marriage, despite her sister's misgivings. Chettam is encouraged to turn his attention to Celia, who has developed an interest in him.

Fred and Rosamond Vincy are the eldest children of Middlemarch's town mayor. Having never finished university, Fred is widely seen as a failure and a layabout, but is content because he is the presumed heir of his childless uncle Mr Featherstone, a rich but unpleasant man. Featherstone keeps as a companion a niece of his by marriage, Mary Garth; although she is considered plain, Fred is in love with her and wants to marry her.

Dorothea and Casaubon experience the first tensions in their marriage on their honeymoon in Rome, when Dorothea finds that her husband has no interest in involving her in his intellectual pursuits and no real intention of having his copious notes published, which was her chief reason for marrying him. She meets Will Ladislaw, Casaubon's much younger disinherited cousin whom he supports financially. Ladislaw begins to feel attracted to Dorothea; she remains oblivious, but the two become friendly.

Fred becomes deeply in debt and finds himself unable to repay what he owes. Having asked Mr Garth, Mary's father, to co-sign the debt, he now tells Garth he must forfeit it. As a result, Mrs Garth's savings from four years of income, held in reserve for the education of her youngest son, are wiped out, as are Mary's savings. Mr Garth thus warns Mary against ever marrying Fred.

Fred comes down with an illness and is treated by Dr Tertius Lydgate, a newly arrived doctor in Middlemarch. Lydgate has modern ideas about medicine and sanitation and believes doctors should prescribe, but not themselves dispense medicines. This draws ire and criticism of many in town. He allies himself with Bulstrode, a wealthy, church-going landowner and developer who wants to build a hospital and clinic that follow Lydgate's philosophy, despite the misgivings of Lydgate's friend, Farebrother, about Bulstrode's integrity. Lydgate also becomes acquainted with Rosamond Vincy, who is beautiful and educated, but shallow and self-absorbed. Seeking to make a good match, she decides to marry Lydgate, who comes from a wealthy family, and uses Fred's sickness as an opportunity to get close to him. Lydgate initially views their relationship as pure flirtation and backs away from Rosamond after discovering that the town considers them practically engaged. However, on seeing her a final time, he breaks his resolution and the two become engaged.

Casaubon arrives back from Rome about the same time, but suffers a heart attack. Lydgate attends him and tells Dorothea it is difficult to pronounce on the nature of Casaubon's illness and chances of recovery: that he may indeed live about 15 years if he takes it easy and ceases his studies, but it is equally possible the disease may develop rapidly, in which case death will be sudden. As Fred recovers, Mr Featherstone falls ill. On his deathbed, he reveals that he has made two wills and tries to get Mary to help him destroy one. Unwilling to be involved in the business, she refuses, and Featherstone dies with both wills still intact. Featherstone's plan had been for £10,000 to go to Fred Vincy, but his estate and fortune instead go to his illegitimate son, Joshua Rigg.

Casaubon, in poor health, has grown suspicious of Dorothea's goodwill to Ladislaw. He tries to make Dorothea promise, if he should die, to forever "avoid doing what I should deprecate, and apply yourself to do what I should desire". She is hesitant to agree, and he dies before she can reply. Casaubon's will is revealed to contain a provision that, if Dorothea marries Ladislaw, she will lose her inheritance. The peculiar nature of the condition leads to general suspicion that Ladislaw and Dorothea are lovers, creating awkwardness between the two. Ladislaw is in love with Dorothea but keeps this secret, having no desire to involve her in scandal or cause her disinheritance. She realises she has romantic feelings for him, but must suppress them. He remains in Middlemarch, working as a newspaper editor for Mr Brooke, who is mounting a campaign to run for Parliament on a Reform platform.

Lydgate's efforts to please Rosamond soon leave him deeply in debt, and he is forced to seek help from Bulstrode. He is partly sustained in this by a friendship with Camden Farebrother. Meanwhile, Fred Vincy's humiliation at being responsible for Caleb Garth's financial setbacks shocks him into reassessing his life. He resolves to train as a land agent under the forgiving Caleb. He asks Farebrother to plead his case to Mary Garth, not realizing that Farebrother is also in love with her. Farebrother does so, thereby sacrificing his own desires for the sake of Mary, who he realises truly loves Fred and is just waiting for him to find his place in the world.

John Raffles, a mysterious man who knows of Bulstrode's shady past, appears in Middlemarch, intending to blackmail him. In his youth, the church-going Bulstrode engaged in questionable financial dealings; his fortune is founded on his marriage to a wealthy, much older widow. The widow's daughter, who should have inherited her mother's fortune, had run away; Bulstrode located her but failed to disclose this to the widow, so that he inherited the fortune in lieu of her daughter. The widow's daughter had a son, who turns out to be Ladislaw. On grasping their connection, Bulstrode is consumed with guilt and offers Ladislaw a large sum of money, which Ladislaw refuses as being tainted. Bulstrode's terror of public exposure as a hypocrite leads him to hasten the death of the mortally sick Raffles, while lending a large sum to Lydgate, whom Bulstrode had previously refused to bail out of his debt. However, the story of Bulstrode's misdeeds has already spread. Bulstrode's disgrace engulfs Lydgate: knowledge of the loan spreads and he is assumed to be complicit with Bulstrode. Only Dorothea and Farebrother retain any faith in him, but Lydgate and Rosamond are still encouraged to leave Middlemarch by the general opprobrium. Disgraced and reviled, Bulstrode's one consolation is that his wife stands by him as he too faces exile.

When Mr Brooke's election campaign collapses, Ladislaw decides to leave the town and visits Dorothea to say his farewell, but Dorothea has fallen in love with him. She renounces Casaubon's fortune and shocks her family by announcing that she will marry Ladislaw. At the same time, Fred, having been successful in his new career, marries Mary.

The "Finale" details the ultimate fortunes of the main characters. Fred and Mary marry and live contentedly with their three sons. Lydgate operates a successful practice outside Middlemarch and attains a good income, but never finds fulfilment and dies at the age of 50, leaving Rosamond and four children. After he dies, Rosamond marries a wealthy physician. Ladislaw engages in public reform, and Dorothea is content as a wife and mother to their two children. Their son eventually inherits Arthur Brooke's estate.

Characters

Dorothea Brooke: An intelligent, wealthy woman with great aspirations, Dorothea avoids displaying her wealth and embarks upon projects such as redesigning cottages for her uncle's tenants. She marries the elderly Reverend Edward Casaubon, with the idealistic idea of helping him in his research, The Key to All Mythologies. However, the marriage was a mistake, as Casaubon fails to take her seriously and resents her youth, enthusiasm and energy. Her requests to assist him make it harder for him to conceal that his research is years out of date. Faced with Casaubon's coldness on their honeymoon, Dorothea becomes friends with his relative, Will Ladislaw. Some years after Casaubon's death she falls in love with Will and marries him.
Tertius Lydgate: An idealistic, talented, but naive young doctor, is relatively poor, but of good birth. He hopes to make big advances in medicine through his research, but ends up in an unhappy marriage with Rosamond Vincy. His attempts to show he is answerable to no man fail, and he eventually has to leave town, sacrificing his high ideals to please his wife.
Rev. Edward Casaubon : A pedantic, selfish, elderly clergyman is so taken up with his scholarly research that his marriage to Dorothea is loveless. His unfinished book, The Key to All Mythologies, is intended as a monument to Christian syncretism, but his research is out of date as he cannot read German. He is aware of this but admits it to no one.
Mary Garth: The plain, kind daughter of Caleb and Susan Garth serves as Mr Featherstone's nurse. She and Fred Vincy were childhood sweethearts, but she will not let him woo her until he shows himself willing and able to live seriously, practically and sincerely.
Arthur Brooke: The oft-befuddled, none-too-clever uncle of Dorothea and Celia Brooke has a reputation as the worst landlord in the county, but stands for Parliament on a Reform platform.
Celia Brooke: Dorothea's younger sister is a beauty. She is more sensual than Dorothea and does not share her idealism and asceticism. She is only too happy to marry Sir James Chettam when Dorothea rejects him.
Sir James Chettam: A neighbouring landowner, he is in love with Dorothea and helps with her plans to improve conditions for the tenants. When she marries Casaubon, he marries Celia Brooke.
Rosamond Vincy: Vain, beautiful and shallow, Rosamond has a high opinion of her own charms and a low opinion of Middlemarch society. She marries Tertius Lydgate, believing he will raise her social standing and keep her comfortable. When her husband meets financial difficulties, she thwarts his efforts to economise, seeing such sacrifices as beneath her and insulting. She cannot bear the idea of losing social status.
Fred Vincy:  Rosamond's brother has loved Mary Garth from childhood. His family hopes he will advance socially by becoming a clergyman, but he knows Mary will not marry him if he does. Brought up to expect an inheritance from his uncle, Mr Featherstone, he is a spendthrift, but later changes through his love for Mary and finds by studying under Mary's father a profession that gains Mary's respect.
Will Ladislaw: This young cousin of Mr Casaubon has no property, as his grandmother married a poor Polish musician and was disinherited. He is a man of verve, idealism and talent, but no fixed profession. He is in love with Dorothea, but cannot marry her without her losing Mr Casaubon's property.
Humphrey Cadwallader and Elinor Cadwallader: Neighbours of the Brookes, Mr Cadwallader is a rector and Mrs Cadwallader a pragmatic and talkative woman who comments on local affairs with wry cynicism. She disapproves of Dorothea's marriage and Mr Brooke's parliamentary endeavours.
Walter Vincy and Lucy Vincy: A respectable manufacturing couple, they wish their children to advance socially and are disappointed by Rosamond's and Fred's marriages. Vincy's sister is married to Nicholas Bulstrode. Mrs Vincy was an innkeeper's daughter and her sister the second wife of Mr. Featherstone.
Caleb Garth: Mary Garth's father is a kind, honest, generous surveyor and land agent involved in farm management. He is fond of Fred and eventually takes him under his wing.
Camden Farebrother: A poor but clever vicar and amateur naturalist, he is a friend of Lydgate and Fred Vincy and loves Mary Garth. His position improves when Dorothea appoints him to a living after Casaubon's death.
Nicholas Bulstrode: A wealthy banker married to Vincy's sister, Harriet, he is a pious Methodist keen to impose his beliefs in Middlemarch society. However, he has a sordid past he is desperate to hide. His religion favours his personal desires and lacks sympathy for others. 
Peter Featherstone: An old landlord of Stone Court, he is a self-made man, who has married Caleb Garth's sister. On her death he takes Mrs Vincy's sister as his second wife.
Jane Waule: A widow and Peter Featherstone's sister, she has a son, John.
Mr Hawley: A foul-mouthed businessman, he is an enemy of Bulstrode.
Mr Mawmsey: A grocer
Dr Sprague: A Middlemarch physician
Mr Tyke: A clergyman favoured by Bulstrode
Joshua Rigg Featherstone: Featherstone's illegitimate son, he appears at the reading of Featherstone's will and receives a fortune instead of Fred. He is also the stepson of John Raffles, who comes into town to visit Rigg, but instead reveals Bulstrode's past. His appearance in the novel is crucial to the plot.
John Raffles: Raffles is a braggart and a bully, a humorous scoundrel in the tradition of Sir John Falstaff, and an alcoholic. But unlike Falstaff, Raffles is a truly evil man. He holds the key to Bulstrode's dark past and Lydgate's future.

Historical novel
The action of Middlemarch takes place "between September 1829 and May 1832", or 40 years before its publication in 1871–1872, a gap not so pronounced for it to be regularly labelled as a historical novel. By comparison, Walter Scott's Waverley (1814) – often seen as the first major historical novel – takes place some 60 years before it appears. Eliot had previously written a more obviously historical novel, Romola (1862–1863), set in 15th-century Florence. The critics Kathleen Blake and Michael York Mason argue that there has been insufficient attention given to Middlemarch "as a historical novel that evokes the past in relation to the present".

The critic Rosemary Ashton notes that the lack of attention to this side of the novel may indicate its merits: "Middlemarch is that very rare thing, a successful historical novel. In fact, it is so successful that we scarcely think of it in terms of that subgenre of fiction." For its contemporary readers, the present "was the passage of the Second Reform Act in 1867"; the agitation for the Reform Act of 1832 and its turbulent passage through the two Houses of Parliament, which provide the structure of the novel, would have been seen as the past.

Though rarely categorised as a historical novel, Middlemarchs attention to historical detail has been noticed; in an 1873 review, Henry James recognised that Eliot's "purpose was to be a generous rural historian". Elsewhere, Eliot has been seen to adopt "the role of imaginative historian, even scientific investigator in Middlemarch and her narrator as conscious "of the historiographical questions involved in writing a social and political history of provincial life". This critic compares the novel to "a work of the ancient Greek historian Herodotus", who is often described as "The Father of History".

Themes

A Study of Provincial Life
The fictional town of Middlemarch, North Loamshire, is probably based on Coventry, where Eliot had lived before moving to London. Like Coventry, Middlemarch is described as a silk-ribbon manufacturing town.

The subtitle—"A Study of Provincial Life"—has been seen as significant. One critic views the unity of Middlemarch as achieved through "the fusion of the two senses of 'provincial'": on the one hand it means geographically "all parts of the country except the capital"; and on the other, a person who is "unsophisticated" or "narrow-minded". Carolyn Steedman links Eliot's emphasis on provincialism in Middlemarch to Matthew Arnold's discussion of social class in England in Culture and Anarchy essays, published in 1869, about the time Eliot began working on the stories that became Middlemarch. There Arnold classes British society in terms of Barbarians (aristocrats and landed gentry), Philistines (urban middle class) and Populace (working class). Steedman suggests Middlemarch "is a portrait of Philistine Provincialism".

It is worth noting that Eliot went to London, as her heroine Dorothea does at the end of the book. There Eliot achieved fame way beyond most women of her time, whereas Dorothea takes on the role of nurturing Will and her family. Eliot was rejected by her family once she had settled in her common-law relationship with Lewes, and "their profound disapproval prevented her ever going home again". She omitted Coventry from her last visit to the Midlands in 1855.

The "Woman Question"
Central to Middlemarch is the idea that Dorothea Brooke cannot hope to achieve the heroic stature of a figure like Saint Theresa, for Eliot's heroine lives at the wrong time, "amidst the conditions of an imperfect social state, in which great feelings will often take the aspect of error, and great faith the aspect of illusion". Antigone, a figure from Greek mythology best known from Sophocles' play, is given in the "Finale" as a further example of a heroic woman. The literary critic Kathleen Blake notes Eliot's emphasis on St Theresa's "very concrete accomplishment, the reform of a religious order", rather than her Christian mysticism. A frequent criticism by feminist critics is that not only is Dorothea  less heroic than Saint Theresa and Antigone, but George Eliot herself. In response, Ruth Yeazell and Kathleen Blake chide these critics for "expecting literary pictures of a strong woman succeeding in a period [around 1830] that did not make them likely in life".

Eliot has also been criticised more widely for ending the novel with Dorothea marrying Will Ladislaw, someone so clearly her inferior. The novelist Henry James describes Ladislaw as a dilettante who "has not the concentrated fervour essential in the man chosen by so nobly strenuous a heroine".

Marriage
Marriage is one of the major themes in Middlemarch. According to George Steiner, "both principal plots [those of Dorothea and Lydgate] are case studies of unsuccessful marriage". This suggests that these "disastrous marriages" leave the lives of Dorothea and Lydgate unfulfilled. This is arguably more the case with Lydgate than with Dorothea, who gains a second chance through her later marriage to Will Ladislaw, but a favourable interpretation of this marriage depends on the character of Ladislaw himself, whom numerous critics have viewed as Dorothea's inferior. In addition, there is the "meaningless and blissful" marriage of Dorothea's sister Celia Brooke to Sir James Chettam, and more significantly Fred Vincy's courting of Mary Garth. In the latter, Mary Garth will not accept Fred until he abandons the Church and settles on a more suitable career. Here Fred resembles Henry Fielding's character Tom Jones, both being moulded into a good husband by the love they give to and receive from a woman.

Dorothea is a St Theresa, born in the wrong century, in provincial Middlemarch, who mistakes in her idealistic ardor, "a poor dry mummified pedant... as a sort of angel of vocation". Middlemarch is in part a Bildungsroman focusing on the psychological or moral growth of the protagonist: Dorothea "blindly gropes forward, making mistakes in her sometimes foolish, often egotistical, but also admirably idealistic attempt to find a role" or vocation that fulfils her nature. Lydgate is equally mistaken in his choice of a partner, as his idea of a perfect wife is someone "who can sing and play the piano and provide a soft cushion for her husband to rest after work". So he marries Rosamond Vincy, "the woman in the novel who most contrasts with Dorothea", and thereby "deteriorates from ardent researcher to fashionable doctor in London".

Critical reception

Contemporary reviews
The Examiner, The Spectator and Athenaeum reviewed each of the eight books that comprise Middlemarch as they were published from December 1871 to December 1872; such reviews speculated on the eventual direction of the plot and responded accordingly. Contemporary response to the novel was mixed. Writing as it was being published, the Spectator reviewer R. H. Hutton criticised it for what he saw as its melancholic quality. Athenaeum, reviewing it after "serialisation", found the work overwrought and thought it would have benefited from hastier composition. Blackwood's Edinburgh Magazine reviewer W. L. Collins saw as the work's most forceful impression its ability to make readers sympathise with the characters. Edith Simcox of Academy offered high praises, hailing it as a landmark in fiction owing to the originality of its form; she rated it first amongst Eliot's œuvre, which meant it "has scarcely a superior and very few equals in the whole wide range of English fiction".
 The author Henry James presented a mixed opinion: Middlemarch, according to him,  was "at once one of the strongest and one of the weakest of English novels ... Middlemarch is a treasure-house of details, but it is an indifferent whole". Among the details, his greatest criticism ("the only eminent failure in the book") was of the character of Ladislaw, who he felt was an insubstantial hero-figure as against Lydgate. The scenes between Lydgate and Rosamond he especially praised for their psychological depth – he doubted whether there were any scenes "more powerfully real... [or] intelligent" in all English fiction.
Thérèse Bentzon, for the Revue des deux Mondes, was critical of Middlemarch. Although finding merit in certain scenes and qualities, she faulted its structure as "made up of a succession of unconnected chapters, following each other at random... The final effect is one of an incoherence which nothing can justify." In her view, Eliot's prioritisation of "observation rather than imagination... inexorable analysis rather than sensibility, passion or fantasy" means that she should not be held amongst the first ranks of novelists. The German philosopher Friedrich Nietzsche, who read Middlemarch in a translation owned by his mother and sister, derided the novel for construing suffering as a means of expiating the debt of sin, which he found characteristic of "little moralistic females à la Eliot".

Despite the divided contemporary response, Middlemarch gained immediate admirers: in 1873, the poet Emily Dickinson expressed high praise for the novel, exclaiming in a letter to a friend: "What do I think of Middlemarch? What do I think of glory."

In separate centuries, Florence Nightingale and Kate Millett remarked on the eventual subordination of Dorothea's own dreams to those of her admirer, Ladislaw. Indeed, the ending acknowledges this and mentions how unfavourable social conditions prevented her from fulfilling her potential.

Later responses
In the first half of the 20th century, Middlemarch continued to provoke contrasting responses; while Leslie Stephen dismissed the novel in 1902, his daughter Virginia Woolf described it in 1919 as "the magnificent book that, which with all its imperfections, is one of the few English novels written for grown-up people." However, Woolf was "virtually unique" among the modernists in her unstinting praise for Middlemarch, and the novel also remained overlooked by the reading public of the time.

F. R. Leavis's The Great Tradition (1948) is credited with having "rediscovered" the novel:
The necessary part of great intellectual powers in such a success as Middlemarch is obvious ... the sheer informedness about society, its mechanisms, the ways in which people of different classes live ... a novelist whose genius manifests itself in a profound analysis of the individual.
Leavis' appraisal of it has been hailed as the beginning of a critical consensus that still exists towards the novel, in which it is recognised not only as Eliot's finest work, but as one of the greatest novels in English. V. S. Pritchett, in The Living Novel, two years earlier, in 1946 had written that "No Victorian novel approaches Middlemarch in its width of reference, its intellectual power, or the imperturbable spaciousness of its narrative ... I doubt if any Victorian novelist has as much to teach the modern novelists as George Eliot ... No writer has ever represented the ambiguities of moral choice so fully".

In the 21st century, the novel is still held in high regard. The novelists Martin Amis and Julian Barnes have both called it probably the greatest novel in the English language, and today Middlemarch is frequently included in university courses. In 2013, the then British Education Secretary Michael Gove referred to Middlemarch in a speech, suggesting its superiority to Stephenie Meyer's vampire novel Twilight. Gove's comments led to debate on teaching Middlemarch in Britain, including the question of when novels like Middlemarch should be read, and the role of canonical texts in teaching. The novel has remained a favourite with readers and scores high in reader rankings: in 2003 it was No. 27 in the BBC's The Big Read, and in 2007 it was No. 10 in "The 10 Greatest Books of All Time", based on a ballot of 125 selected writers. In 2015, in a BBC Culture poll of book critics outside the UK, the novel was ranked at number one in "The 100 greatest British novels".

On 5 November 2019, the BBC News reported that Middlemarch is on the BBC list of 100 "most inspiring" novels.

Legacy and adaptations
Middlemarch has been adapted several times for television and the stage. In 1968 it appeared as a BBC-produced TV mini-series of the same name, directed by Joan Craft, starring Michele Dotrice. The first episode, "Dorothea", is missing from the BBC Archives, while the third episode, "The New Doctor", can be viewed online, although only as a low-quality black and white telerecording owned by a private collector. The other five episodes have been withheld from public viewing. In 1994 it was again adapted by the BBC as a television series of the same name, directed by Anthony Page with a screenplay by Andrew Davies. This was a critical and financial success and revived public interest adaptating the classics. In 2013 came a stage adaptation, and also an Orange Tree Theatre Repertory production adapted and directed by Geoffrey Beevers as three plays: Dorothea's Story, The Doctor's Story, and Fred & Mary. The novel has never been made into a film, although the idea was toyed with by the English director Sam Mendes. In April 2022, Dash Arts produced The Great Middlemarch Mystery, an immersive theatre experience staged across three locations in Coventry, including Drapers Hall.

The opera Middlemarch in Spring by Allen Shearer, to a libretto by Claudia Stevens, has a cast of six and treats only the central story of Dorothea Brooke. It was first staged in San Francisco in 2015. In 2017, a modern adaptation, Middlemarch: The Series, aired on YouTube as a video blog. Lyrics for the song "How Soon Is Now?" by The Smiths were taken from Middlemarch ("I am the son and heir, of nothing in particular").

Notes

References

Bibliography

 

Eliot, George. , Eliot, George Volume 2, Volume 3, Volume 4
Eliot, George. Middlemarch free PDF of Blackwood's 1878 Cabinet Edition (the critical standard with Eliot's final corrections) at the George Eliot Archive

Further reading
Adam, Ian, ed. (1975). This Particular Web: essays on Middlemarch. Toronto: University of Toronto Press
Bloom, Harold, ed. (2009). George Eliot. Philadelphia, PA: Chelsea .

Carroll, David, ed. (1971). George Eliot: The Critical Heritage. London: Routledge & K Paul. 
Chase, Karen, ed. (2006). Middlemarch in the Twenty-First Century. Oxford: Oxford University Press
Daiches, David (1963).  George Eliot: Middlemarch. London: Arnold
Dentith, Simon (1986). George Eliot. Brighton, Sussex: Harvester Press. 
Garrett, Peter K (1980). The Victorian Multiplot Novel: Studies in Dialogical Form. New Haven: Yale University Press. 
Graver, Suzanne (1984). George Eliot and Community: A Study in Social Theory and Fictional Form. Berkeley: University of California Press..  
Harvey, W. J. (1961). The Art of George Eliot. London: Chatto & Windus
Harvey, W. J. (1967). "Criticism of the Novel: Contemporary Reception". In Hardy, Barbara Nathan. Middlemarch: Critical Approaches to the Novel (2013 ed.). London: Bloomsbury. 
Kettle, Arnold (1951). An Introduction to the English Novel, Volume I: To George Eliot. London: Hutchinson
Mead, Rebecca (2014). My Life in Middlemarch. New York: Crown. 
Neale, Catherine (1989). George Eliot, Middlemarch. London: Penguin Books. 
Tillotson, Geoffrey(1951). Criticism and the Nineteenth Century Novel.
Trainini, Marco, Vendetta, tienimi compagnia. Due vendicatori in "Middlemarch" di George Eliot e "Anna Karenina" di Lev Tolstoj, Milano, Arcipelago Edizioni, 2012, .

Contemporary reviews
Athenaeum, 7 December 1872
Bentzon, TH. Revue des deux Mondes, February 1873
Broome, F. N. The Times, 7 March 1873
Collins, W. L. Blackwood's Edinburgh Magazine, December 1872
Colvin, Sidney, The Fortnightly Review, 1 January 1873
Hutton, R. H. The Spectator, 1 June 1872
Hutton, R. H. British Quarterly Review, 1 April 1873
Simcox, Edith, The Academy, 1 January 1873

Later reviews
Woolf, Virginia, "George Eliot", The Times Literary Supplement, 20 November 1919

External links

Middlemarch free PDF of Blackwood's 1878 Cabinet Edition (the critical standard with Eliot's final corrections) at the George Eliot Archive
Manuscript of Middlemarch at the British Library
Middlemarch on the British Library's Discovering Literature website

Middlemarch at Victorian Web

1871 British novels
1872 British novels
British novels adapted into television shows
English novels
Fiction set in 1829
Fiction set in 1830
Fiction set in 1831
Fiction set in 1832
Fictional populated places in England
Novels by George Eliot
Novels first published in serial form
Novels set in the 1820s
Novels set in the 1830s
Novels set in England
Realist novels
Victorian novels